is a 1994 side-scrolling action game released by Banpresto for the Super Famicom based on the Tetsuwan Atom series.

Plot
The game follow the story of the 1960s series with several designs from the 1980 series thrown in like Uran's and young Atlas' designs.

External links

1994 video games
Astro Boy video games
Banpresto games
Minato Giken games
Superhero video games
Japan-exclusive video games
Platform games
Super Nintendo Entertainment System games
Super Nintendo Entertainment System-only games
Video games developed in Japan